The 2019 Judo Grand Prix Tel Aviv was held in Tel Aviv, Israel, from 24 to 26 January.

Medal summary

Medal table

Men's events

Women's events

References

External links
 

2019 IJF World Tour
2019 Judo Grand Prix
IJF World Tour Tel Aviv
Grand Prix 2019
Judo
Judo
Judo
Judo Grand Prix Tel Aviv